The 2010 World Figure Skating Championships was a senior international figure skating competition in the 2009–10 season. Medals were awarded in the disciplines of men's singles, ladies' singles, pair skating, and ice dancing. The event was held at the Palavela in Turin, Italy from 22 to 28 March.

Qualification
The competition was open to skaters from ISU member nations who had reached the age of 15 by 1 July 2009. The corresponding competition for younger skaters was the 2010 World Junior Championships.

Based on the results of the 2009 World Championships, each country was allowed between one and three entries per discipline. National associations selected their entries based on their own criteria.

Countries which qualified more than one entry per discipline:

Schedule
(Local time, UTC+1)

 Tuesday, 23 March
 12:00 Compulsory dance
 17:15 Opening ceremonies
 18:15 Pairs short program
 Wednesday, 24 March
 09:30 Men's short program
 18:45 Pairs free skating
 Thursday, 25 March
 12:45 Original dance
 18:15 Men's free skating
 Friday, 26 March
 09:00 Ladies' short program
 18:45 Free dance
 Saturday, 27 March
 12:30 Ladies' free skating
 Sunday, 28 March
 14:30 Gala exhibition

Medals summary

Medalists
Medals for overall placement:

Small medals for placement in the short segment:

Small medals for placement in the free segment:

Medals by country
Table of medals for overall placement:

Table of small medals for placement in the short segment:

Table of small medals for placement in the free segment:

Competition notes
 The compulsory dance was the Golden Waltz. 2010 Worlds were the final event to include a compulsory dance. The last compulsory dance in competition was skated by Federica Faiella and Massimo Scali. Canada's Tessa Virtue / Scott Moir set a world record for the original dance, earning 70.27 points, 2010 Worlds were also the final event to include an original dance.
 Daisuke Takahashi became the first Japanese man to win a world title. He attempted a quad flip which made him the first gold medalist to try a quad since 2007 Worlds, but he underrotated the jump, making him the third champion in a row not to land one successfully.
 Mao Asada became the first figure skater from Asia to win multiple world titles.
 Japan won two of the four titles, and both single's titles for the first. 
 Laura Lepistö became the first Finn to medal in ladies' singles at the World Championships.

Results

Men

Ladies

Pairs

Ice dancing

Prize money

References

Other sources

External links

 Official site
 
 2010 Worlds at the ISU
 2010 Worlds TV and Online Broadcast Schedule

World Figure Skating Championships
World Championships
International figure skating competitions hosted by Italy
Sports competitions in Turin
2010s in Turin
March 2010 sports events in Italy